This glossary of nautical terms is an alphabetical listing of terms and expressions connected with ships, shipping, seamanship and navigation on water (mostly though not necessarily on the sea). Some remain current, while many date from the 17th to 19th centuries. The word nautical derives from the Latin nauticus, from Greek nautikos, from nautēs: "sailor", from naus: "ship".

Further information on nautical terminology may also be found at Nautical metaphors in English, and additional military terms are listed in the Multiservice tactical brevity code article. Terms used in other fields associated with bodies of water can be found at Glossary of fishery terms, Glossary of underwater diving terminology, Glossary of rowing terms, and Glossary of meteorology.

This glossary is split into two articles:
 terms starting with the letters A to L are at Glossary of nautical terms (A-L)
 terms starting with the letters M to Z are at Glossary of nautical terms (M-Z).


A

B

C

D

E

F

G

H

I

J

K

L

See also

 Articles that link to this glossary

Notes

References

Sources
 
 
 
  (1848 edition)

Further reading

 

Nautical

Shipbuilding
Water transport
Wikipedia glossaries using description lists